Chaetodermatidae is a family of molluscs belonging to the order Caudofoveata.

Genera:
 Chaetoderma Lovén, 1844
 Falcidens Salvini-Plawen, 1968
 Furcillidens  Scheltema, 1998

References

Aplacophorans
Mollusc families